Snapplify is an edtech company, specialising in digital education content, related educational services, and devices. Snapplify is an African ebook aggregator and distributor, with an ebook offering of 240 000 titles from about 250 publishers. Snapplify has worked with many schools across Africa, offering them digital education tools.

Snapplify was founded by Wesley Lynch in 2011 in South Africa. The business has expanded into Africa, Europe and the United States, with offices across South Africa, as well as in Nairobi, Amsterdam and New Jersey.

History

Snapplify was launched at the Frankfurt Book Fair in October 2011, as a subsidiary of Realm Digital. The company secured a number of global partnerships, working with brands such as Random House, Popular Mechanics, Rolling Stone, Ramsay Media, and First National Bank (FNB).
 
In 2015, South African venture capital firm AngelHub, backed by former First National Bank CEO Michael Jordaan and RMB co-founder Paul Harris’ family, announced that it had invested in Snapplify. In 2016, Snapplify raised expansion capital from existing funder AngelHub Ventures, as well as new backers from South Africa and the UK to enable the company's continued growth into new markets in Africa.
 
In 2019, Snapplify secured $2 million expansion capital from venture capital firm Knife Capital, and empowered African investment manager Hlayisani Capital's Hlayisani Growth Fund. In early 2019, Snapplify released basic Engage – a free version of their Engage e-learning platform. In 2020, Snapplify acquired Onnie Media, an educator media hub for SA teachers, and the hub’s online marketplace for teachers in South Africa, Teacha!

References

Education companies of South Africa